Keel VI: Back in Action is the sixth album by heavy metal band Keel and the first to feature the classic lineup since their self-titled 1987 album. It features rare, unreleased tracks from the band's previous studio sessions, plus a cover of the Argent song "Hold Your Head Up."

This was the last album to feature bassist/co-founder Kenny Chaisson, as he opted not to be with the band on their 25th anniversary reunion in 2009.

Track listing
 "Back in Action" (Kenny Chaisson, Marc Ferrari, Brian Jay, Ron Keel, Dwain Miller) - 3:01
 "Reason to Rock" (Chaisson, Jay, Keel, Miller) - 3:13
 "United Nations" (Keel) - 4:11
 "Friday Every Night" (Jay, Keel) - 3:28
 "Reach Out and Rock Somebody" (Ferrari) - 3:17
 "Hold Your Head Up" (Rod Argent, Chris White) - 3:11
 "Proud to Be Loud" (Ferrari) - 3:36
 "Answers in Your Eyes" (Ferrari) - 4:18
 "Lay Down the Law '84" (Keel) - 3:57
 "Speed Demon '84" (Keel) - 4:14

Personnel
 Ron Keel - vocals and keyboards
 Marc Ferrari - guitar and vocals
 Brian Jay - guitar and vocals
 Kenny Chaisson - bass and vocals
 Dwain Miller - drums and vocals

References

Keel (band) albums
1998 albums